Gil Cordero Burgos (born 13 April 1992, in Veracruz City) is a Mexican professional footballer who last played for Tepatitlán de Morelos.

External links
 

1992 births
Living people
Mexican footballers
C.D. Veracruz footballers
Club América footballers
Atlante F.C. footballers
Cimarrones de Sonora players
Atlético Reynosa footballers
C.D. Tepatitlán de Morelos players
Liga MX players
Ascenso MX players
Liga Premier de México players
Tercera División de México players
Footballers from Veracruz
People from Veracruz (city)

Association footballers not categorized by position